The International Obesity Task Force (IOTF) is an organization designed to combat obesity around the world.  It is part of the International Association for the Study of Obesity.

See also
 Obesity in the Middle East and North Africa

References

External links
Official website
Overeaters Anonymous website
Listen to Speakers from Overeaters Anonymous

Obesity organizations
International medical and health organizations